Silent Majority Group is a record label founded in 2006 by former Creed, Alter Bridge, and Sevendust artist manager Jeff Hanson that concentrates on finding and developing up-and-coming alternative, rock and pop acts such as Framing Hanley, Paramore and Brother Sundance, as well as providing a home for established acts such as Candlebox and Tantric. The label also provides artist and producer management. SMG is promoted and distributed by both Kobalt / Awal and ADA/Warner Music Group.

Roster 
One Day Alive
Blacklite District
Brother Sundance

Former 
Candlebox
Course of Nature
Family Force Five
Framing Hanley
MuteMath
Paramore
Sevendust
SR71
Tantric

Alternative rock record labels
American independent record labels